Arts Emergency is a UK-based charity that seeks opportunities in the Arts and Humanities sector for underrepresented young people aged 16-26.

History
Founded by campaigner Neil Griffiths (current CEO) and comedian Josie Long in 2011, Arts Emergency was created in response to the increasing tuition fees, abolition of public funding for the teaching of arts subjects in British universities and the lack of social mobility in the Arts, a belief reinforced by the 2015 Panic! survey initiated by Create London and the 2018 Panic! It's an Arts Emergency Report led by academics Drs Dave O’Brien, Orian Brook, and Mark Taylor from the Universities of Edinburgh and Sheffield. The Charity launched with an event at the Hackney Empire in the London borough that hosted its pilot project in 2012.

Work
Arts Emergency runs a national "alternative" Old Boy Network that aims to create privilege for people without privilege, and tackle the inequalities that exist with access to arts degrees and careers in the sector. The Arts Emergency Network is made up of over 10,000 volunteers working in TV, film, music, art, fashion, academia, law, architecture, activism, comedy, social work, journalism, publishing, design, activism and theatre.

The Charity offers opportunities ranging from mentoring and coaching with industry professionals, work experience, tickets to events and financial aid to buy resources. This assistance aims to help young people make informed decisions about the career they wish to pursue and develop an understanding of how they can do it.

Young people are able to access resources, advice and guidance through the volunteer network until they are 26 years old.

Members of the Arts Emergency Network include the comedians Joe Lycett, Nish Kumar, Chris Addison and Mathew Baynton, journalist Yomi Adegoke, writer and producer Jack Thorne, authors Neil Gaiman and Sarah Perry and actor Julie Hesmondhalgh.

The organisation currently runs programmes in London, Brighton, Manchester and Merseyside as well as offering remote opportunities.

References

External links
 

Cultural charities based in the United Kingdom
2011 establishments in the United Kingdom